Haedong Yonggung Temple (Hangul: 해동 용궁사, Hanja :海東龍宮寺)  is a Buddhist temple in Gijang-gun, Busan, South Korea. The temple was built in 1376 by the teacher known as Naong during the Goryeo Dynasty, and was originally known as Bomun Temple (보문사). It was destroyed during the Japanese invasions of Korea (1592–98) but was rebuilt in the 1930s, and was renamed Haedong Yonggung Temple in 1974. The temple complex is a large one and one of few in Korea to be set on the seaside. As such, combined with its proximity to Haeundae Beach and the east side of Busan, the temple is popular with sightseers, particularly during Buddha's Birthday celebrations when the complex is decorated with paper lanterns. It honors Haesu Gwaneum Daebul (Hangul: 해수관음 대불), the Sea Goddess Buddha of Mercy, who is an aspect of Guanyin.

References

External links 

Buddhist temples in South Korea
Buildings and structures in Busan
Gijang County